The following is a list of notable artists that have been described as gothic rock by reliable sources. "Gothic rock" is a term typically used to describe a musical subgenre of post-punk and alternative rock that formed during the late 1970s. Gothic rock bands grew from the strong ties they had to the English punk rock and emerging post-punk scenes. According to both Pitchfork and NME, proto-goth bands included Joy Division, Siouxsie and the Banshees, Bauhaus and the Cure. The term was first used by critic John Stickney in 1967 to describe the music and accompanying performances by the Doors. The Doors' lyrics and their "audience-antagonizing performances" have even been seen as the beginning of gothic rock.

0–9
 1919
 45 Grave
 The 69 Eyes

A
 AFI
 Alien Sex Fiend
 All About Eve
 And Also the Trees
 Andi Sexgang
ASP
 Asylum Party
 Ausgang
 The Awakening

B
 Balaam and the Angel
 The Batfish Boys
 Bauhaus
 Big Electric Cat
 The Birthday Party
 The Breath of Life
 Buck-Tick

C
 Children on Stun
 Christian Death
 The Church
 Clan of Xymox
 Closterkeller
 Cocteau Twins
 Corpus Delicti
 Cradle of Thorns
 The Crüxshadows
 The Cult
 The Cure

D
 Damien Done
 The Damned
 The Danse Society
 Dead Can Dance 
 Death in June
Depeche Mode
 Diva Destruction
 Drab Majesty

E
 The Eden House
 Eva O
 Evanescence

F
 Faith and the Muse
 Fields of the Nephilim
 Flesh for Lulu

G
 Gene Loves Jezebel
 Ghost Dance
 Gitane Demone

H
 HIM

I
 Ikon
 Inkubus Sukkubus

J
 Joy Division

K
 Killing Joke
 Kommunity FK
Komu Vnyz

L
 Lacrimosa 
 L'Âme Immortelle
 The Last Days of Jesus
 London After Midnight
 The Lords of the New Church
 Love Like Blood
 Lycia

M
 Malice Mizer
 Mandragora Scream
 The March Violets
 Mephisto Walz
 The Merry Thoughts
 The Mission
 Mono Inc.
 Mors Syphilitica

N
 Nick Cave and the Bad Seeds
 Nic Nassuet
 Nightingale
 Nightmare
 Nosferatu

P

 Paralysed Age
Party Day
 Peter Murphy
 Pink Turns Blue
 Play Dead

Q

R
 Rasputina
 Razed in Black
 Red Lorry Yellow Lorry
 Rhea's Obsession
 Rome Burns
 Rosetta Stone

S
 Samhain
 Saviour Machine
 Scarling
 Screams for Tina
 Sex Gang Children
 Shadow Project
She Wants Revenge
 Siiiii
 Siouxsie and the Banshees
 The Sisters of Mercy
 Skeletal Family
 Soul Merchants
 Southern Death Cult
 Specimen
 Strange Boutique
 Super Heroines
 Switchblade Symphony

T
 Theatre of Hate
 Theatre of Ice
 These New Puritans
 This Mortal Coil
 Two Witches
 Type O Negative

U
 UK Decay

V
 The Veils
 Virgin Prunes
 Voltaire

W
 The Wake
 Rozz Williams

X
 Xmal Deutschland

Y
 You Shriek

Z
 Zeraphine

See also 
 List of gothic metal bands

References

Gothic rock
Goth subculture

Gothic rock